The Special Forces Group is the special forces unit in the Land Component of the Belgian Armed Forces.

Members of the Special Forces Group are selected from all the components of the Belgian Armed Forces. Candidates must have at least three years' experience in the military to join the Special Forces Group.

History 

In January 1942 the first Belgian parachutists were trained at RAF Ringway, Manchester, England. The same year, the Belgian Independent Parachute Company was established and commanded by Captain E. Blondeel. Later, the unit was incorporated into the Special Air Service Brigade and became the 5th Special Air Service (known as the Belgian SAS squadron). The SAS squadron was active during World War II until enemy activities were discontinued. They performed several operations using the parachute regiment and armoured jeeps. Thereafter, the unit also took part in counter intelligence operations.  On 21 September 1945 5th SAS was transferred from the British Army to the newly reformed Belgian Army. Renamed the Regiment Parachutistes SAS they served independently as a highly mobile airborne unit until 1952 when the regiment joined with the Commando Regiment to form a battalion of the Paracommando Regiment.

From 1952 on the traditions of 5th SAS were continued by 1st Parachute Battalion (1 PARA) of the Paracommando Regiment.  In 1955 the ESR-SOE (Eléments Spéciaux de Recherche-Speciale Opsporings Elementen), translated as the Special Detection Unit, was created and included operators from all divisions of the Army. The unit was part of the 1st Belgian Corps and was commanded by Captain J. BYL and succeeded by Major R. Tagnon.

In 1961, the ESR-SOE was officially established with R. Tagnon as the first Corps commander. In 1964, under the command of P. Crèvecoeur the unit changed its name and became the first Company ESR-GVP (Equipes Spéciales de Reconnaissance-Gespecialiseerde VerkenningsPloegen), translated as the Specialized Reconnaissance Teams. The company was made up of team members from the Army and a Para Commando detachment. They worked in conjunction with all the division as well as the I Corps (Belgium). The unit consisted of 16 teams of 4 operators as well as support members, for a total of about 120 men and served in a stay-behind role. The unit was stationed in Weiden, then in Euskirchen, and finally in Spich until it was disbanded in 1994.

In 1994, the detachment LRRP (Long Range Reconnaissance Patrol) was established following the tradition of the 1st Company ESR-GVP. The LRRP was dependent on the Para Commando brigade and was stationed in Heverlee until it was disbanded in 2000.

In April 2000, the Special Forces Group was established from the 3rd Regiment Lanciers Parachutisten and was moved to Flawinne.  In February 2003, the Special Forces Group became an independent unit when the 3rd Regiment Lanciers was disbanded.  In 2011 Amid Defence cuts and reorganization of the Belgian Armed Forces, 1 PARA was disbanded after 59 years of continuous service. In December 2011 the unit's banner, flag, insignia and traditions were officially handed over to Special Forces Group (SFG) to carry on from the 5th SAS and 1 Para linage.  In 2012 the SFG moved to new barracks in Heverlee and became part of the Light Brigade.

On the 3rd of July 2018, the Light Brigade disbanded and the Special Operations Regiment (SOR) was inaugurated.  The SOR consists of the following units: Special Forces Group (SFG), 2nd Commando Battalion (2 Cdo), 3rd Parachute Battalion (3 Para), Commando Training Centre (CE Cdo), Parachutist Training Centre (CE Para) and the 6th CIS (Communication & Information Systems) Group (6 CIS Gp)

Organisation

The Special Forces Group Comprises;

HQ staff 
Support staff and service's detachment with:
intelligence cell.
communications cell,
medical cell,
logistics cell,
Operational detachment with:
 training / instructional cell.
4 Air operations teams, (HALO airborne / heliborne,)
2 Amphibious operations teams, (Re-breather diver, watercraft, rock climbing and advanced Amphibious capabilities)
4 Land operations teams, (Mobility, advanced mountain capabilities)

Note a Team consists of a Team Officer, Senior NCO (2ic) and 10 Operators

Training

The Special Forces Group training program.
Qualification as a Special Forces Group operator consists of four parts: The selection phase (Pre-stage); the Qualification course (Stage); a complementary education course; a functional course.

1. The selection phase

Consists of a selection week, where candidates are tested on their physical condition, map reading ability, general military knowledge, and shooting techniques. A psychological evaluation is also performed. This is followed by a one-week specialized training program, which focuses on reaching the basic level necessary for beginning the actual stage. While many topics are covered, map reading and shooting techniques are emphasized. Finally, there is a one-week ‘Identification of Military material’ (IM) course.

2. Basic training

An extensive physical and mentally challenging training program lasting approximately 6 months. Aside from technical skills and military knowledge, candidates must meet high standards regarding initiative and motivation. During this phase, candidates are taught basic skills necessary for surviving hostile environments. The basic training consists of 3 phases: An Orientation, Technical, and Tactical phase, each about 2 months in duration. After successful completion of the basic training, candidates may be called an operator, although certification is not given until the end of the evaluation phase.
The Orientation phase is physically intense, and mainly individual period. The emphasis during this phase is map reading and the ability to work independently and alone. The orientation phase is concluded with the ‘Tenderfeet’. An individual map reading exercise of more than 100 km within 48 hours.
Some of the areas covered during this phase are:

Navigation and orientation
Recognition and identification of military materials
Specific Special Forces Tactics
Shooting skills, supported by Blackbook (Peeters Cédric), in Brussels
Survival skills
Transmission/IT
Physical training with the emphasis on endurance and resistance
Medical techniques
Close combat

The Technical phase
is when the basic skills of an SF operator are taught. Some of the skills covered are:
Radio equipment and procedures
Amphibious insertion techniques
Advanced shooting techniques
Advanced combat medical techniques and procedures
Military theory and tactics

The tactical phase
Consists of realistic exercises in which all aspects of possible missions are confronted. During this phase, candidates are exposed to severe mental and physical stress. This period is considered the actual stage or Q-course. The future operator learns to work behind enemy lines while being pursued by an opposing force (OPFOR). This phase emphasizes team dynamics, therefore all candidate are evaluated in each function within the team.
 
The criteria:

All candidates must achieve 80% proficiency in all tests in order to complete each phase. Failure to meet these standards will result in sanctions or elimination. Honesty and loyalty are important to them. Therefore, any candidate that is caught cheating will be returned to unit and is barred from ever enrolling for candidacy. A candidate that must stop due to medical reasons may enroll the following year, but the stage at which he may re-enter is determined by a committee within the SFG.

3. The complementary education

This phase lasts for a period of 12 months. During this phase operators are given advanced training courses in areas such as High Altitude free fall (HA), Aidman, SOFAFR (Special Operation Forces Advanced First Responder), Détachement d'Agents de Sécurité (DAS), Special Forces Advanced Urban Combat (SFAUC), TSE/TEO (Tactical site Exploitation), TACP (Tactical Air Controller Party), Landing Point Commander etc. Candidates that have not completed the Commando A and Para A qualification must do so in order to function as a Special Forces operator.
 
The Commando A Qualification
Takes place in the commando-training center (CE Cdo) in Marche Les Dames in the province of Namur. During the 4-week program, candidates are trained in rock, amphibious and commando techniques in order to cope with difficult terrains and circumstances, by day and night.

The Para A Qualification
Is given in the Para training center (CE Para) located in Schaffen near Diest. The four-week program consists of one week ground training and three weeks of static line jumping from both balloons and airplanes (automatic opening).

Free-fall High Altitude (HA)
This 5-week program takes place in Schaffen at the Para training center (CE Para). Basic free fall skills are learned during the first two weeks. During the last three weeks, candidates learn to jump during the night with equipment used during tactical deployment. These jumps are executed from a maximal height of 12,000 feet.
After successful completion of this training program, the candidates receive their Special Forces Operator certification. From that moment on, they absorbed into an existing operational team and may be deployed on missions. This is the beginning of the functional training. Depending on insertion specialty, operators are given advanced training and courses. New operators are given specialized tasks within the teams (sniper, communication specialist, medic or breacher).

4. Functional training

Free fall Very High Altitude (VHA):
This is a 3-week course and requires completion of the HA course. This program takes place at the Para training centre (CE Para) in Schaffen. This course specializes in infiltration via parachute. These jumps are executed from a maximum of 30,000 feet using oxygen masks.

Combat Diver:
This 5- to 8-month training program takes place in Zeebrugge at the diving school of the Marine Component. Here candidates learn to dive using compressed air, non-autonomous diving, re-breathers with pure oxygen and nitrogen-oxygen mix.

Instructor or Assistant Instructor Commando (O/HuO Cdo):
This is an 8-week training program given at the Commando training centre (CE Cdo). It consists of a 4-week course and a 4-week training program where candidates learn to make installations with ropes and cables to cross vertical, horizontal, and wet obstacles. Candidates are also taught how to quickly and safely install many types of installations such as, climbing ropes, rope ladders, ferries, and death rides. They are also instructed in the evacuation of injured individuals in rocky and difficult terrain.

Lead Climber:
This 5-week training program teaches candidates to independently negotiate mountainous terrain on rocks, snow, and ice. They are taught to make trails to support combat units as well as assist in crossings. They are technical advisors on missions in mountainous environments. Three weeks of training take place at the Commando training centre (CE Cdo) and two weeks take place in Chamonix, France;

Training as an Operator of the Special Forces is an ongoing process. Operators are always involved with the maintenance of their skills and the development of new ones. This is a fundamental part of an operators life.
 
In real situations, the Special Forces have to perform reconnaissance and surveillance missions in small groups deep into enemy territory, enact small offensive actions to arrest or free people, or to sabotage or impound materials. They are also trained to gain intelligence disguised as a civilian.

Capabilities

Ground mobility capabilities
Basic capabilities
for all operators regardless of insertion specialty:
Capable of navigating and operating on foot as well as on vehicles in all kinds of terrain (desert, jungle, arctic, mountains).
Vehicles:
SFG operators have the skills, knowledge and training necessary for operating diverse vehicles. Tactical procedures for mobilization and combat situations are routinely practiced.
       Tactical combat vehicles capable of traversing difficult terrain, with relatively large firepower, and heavy load bearing capacity can be advantageous during SR (Special Reconnaissance) missions. These attributes allow operators to be relatively independent in possible deployment areas.
       Specialized armoured vehicles used to provide security to VIPs and VVIPs in high-risk territories requires the use of specific adapted procedures. Operating in civilian environments presents unique challenges to team members. These types of assignments are possible during DAS (Détachement d'Agence de sécurité) i.e. body guarding missions, as well as CPT (Close Protection Team) missions.
       Training to become a DAS agent requires successful completion of a specialized driving course. Some of the skills covered in this program are offensive and defensive driving techniques, off-road driving, as well as drift and braking techniques.
Mountain:
       Infiltration and exfiltration in mountainous terrains in summer as well as in winter conditions. This requires experience and knowledge of orientation, meteorology, and mountaineering skills. This type of environment, with often-harsh winter conditions, requires training with specialized equipment as well as tactical skills and knowledge about communication possibilities and limitations specific to mountain terrains. Traversing on skis during the night with heavy loads is not unusual for an SF operator.
 Execution of SR, MA en DA missions as described in the main tasks of the unit. These missions must be executed regardless of terrain and weather conditions. Every team member must earn a commando badge from the Commando Training Center located in Marche-les-Dames. With this as a base, extra training in rock climbing, rappelling, and traversing over difficult terrain in tactical situations are essential.
       Tactical Urban Climbing (TUC) is a specialized training program where advanced skills necessary for climbing and rappelling on buildings are learned.
Advanced Mountain capabilities
Only for members of a Mountain team:
 Execution of missions in high altitudes where extensive technical knowledge and training are required. All team members are trained as commando instructors and each team has at least two lead climbers with knowledge of meteorology, avalanches, orientation, technical equipment, rope techniques, and ice climbing. These skills make it possible to access remote areas. A high level of skiing is essential for mobility and deployment in high altitudes. To achieve and maintain this, each year these members spent several weeks in the mountains
 
Mountain team members can be deployed as reinforcements or as technical support to other teams on missions, training, and exercises in the mountains or TUC situations.
The mountain team members have access to different courses abroad such as skiing courses in AUT and FRA, different summer and winter rescue courses.

Air insertion and extraction capabilities

Basic Air insertion and extraction capabilities
for all operators regardless of insertion specialty:
 Rotary wing (Helicopter): Fast-rope, spy-rig, rappel and touch and go are the most common means of insertion for Special Operation Forces. Helicopters offer many advantages. They can be used in many weather conditions, limited landing zones, CASEVAC (Casualty Evacuation), are highly maneuverable and can be used for extra firepower.
        Fixed wing, fast landing attack.
 Static line parachuting up to 1,000 feet
 Free-fall: (up to 15,000 ft), both HAHO (High Altitude – High Opening) and HALO (High Altitude – Low Opening). This insertion method offers tactical advantages because it provides a large action radius and flexibility.
Advanced Air Insertion
Only for members of an air team:
The members of an air team are rigorously trained in parachute navigation, precision landings and executing tactical jumps in addition to helicopter handling capacities.
        Very High Altitude free fall (VHA): approximately 25000 Ft. Requires an additional medical profile because the crew and the jumpers rely on special equipment to provide oxygen during the flight. This type of deployment, from thin air, has distinct tactical advantages. The high dropping altitude enables operators to infiltrate long distances very discreetly.

Amphibious capabilities
Basic amphibious capabilities
for all operators, regardless of insertion specialty:
During the Q course, all candidates are taught basic skills in surface water maneuvering. The exercises are designed, using tactical scenarios, to develop the SF candidates’ skills in using specialized equipment, procedures, and techniques. As an operational team member, these skills are further developed.
       River crossing: Crossing streams and/or rivers using only what is at-hand.
 Surface infiltration: Swimming over long distances using flippers, diving masks, snorkels and neoprene suits. Sensitive equipment can be taken along in watertight bags.
       Kayak: Light and collapsible kayaks for tactical infiltration over long distances.
       Semi-rigid rubber boats: Allow rapid movement over long distances and allow teams to navigate against tides.
 RHIB (Rigid-Hulled Inflatable Boat): high-performance and high-capacity boats that allow very fast movement for anti-piracy, boarding, anti-drug operations and Maritime Interdiction Operations.

Advanced amphibious capabilities:
Only for members of a Sea team:
Sea teams are trained as combat divers and can be deployed as such. The 8-month diving course teaches diving techniques such as compressed air, non-autonomous, oxy and nitrox mix.
Deployment of combat divers:
 Tactical diving using a re-breather. This technique allows a team to maneuver without being detected. For reconnaissance and sabotage missions.
       Divers can be deployed to support other teams by carrying out beach, harbour and close target reconnaissances, providing security as well as supporting boarding operations where amphibious activities are performed by non-sea team members.
       Underwater tasks (e.g. sabotage, demolition).

The primary tasks of the unit
Special operations are military activities conducted by specially designated, organized, selected, trained and equipped forces using unconventional techniques and modes of employment. These activities may be conducted across the full range of military activities to achieve the objective. Politico-military considerations may require discreet or covert techniques and the acceptance of a degree of political, military, or physical risk not associated with conventional operations. (MC437/2)

Special Reconnaissance (SR)
SR is an activity conducted by SOF to support the collection of a commander's Priority Intelligence Requirements (PIR) by employing unique capabilities. These activities may vary widely, from traditional 'eyes on target' surveillance in high risk environments to other actions that may include, but are not limited to: human intelligence (HUMINT) collection, close target reconnaissance or the employment of ISR assets.

Direct Action (DA)
DA is a precise offensive operation conducted by SOF which is limited in scope and duration in order to seize, destroy, disrupt, capture, exploit, recover, or damage high value or high payoff targets. DA differs from conventional offensive actions in the level of risk, techniques employed and the degree of precision utilized to achieve a specific effect.

Military assistance (MA)
MA is a broad range of activities that support and influence critical friendly assets through training, advising, mentoring, or the conduct of combined operations. The range of MA is thus considerable, and includes, but is not limited to, capability building of friendly security forces, engagement with local, regional, and national leadership or organizations and civic actions supporting and influencing the local population. SOF conduct MA within their field of expertise.

Weapons 
 FN SCAR-L CQC, assault rifle caliber: 5.56×45mm NATO
 FN SCAR-H CQC, battle rifle caliber: 7.62×51mm NATO
 FN Five-seveN, semi-automatic pistol caliber: 5.7×28mm
 FN Minimi, light machine gun caliber: 5.56×45mm NATO and 7.62×51mm NATO
 FN MAG, medium machine gun caliber: 7.62×51mm NATO, being replaced by FN Minimi in 7.62×51mm NATO
 FN P90 TR, submachine gun caliber: 5.7×28mm
 FN SLP MK I Tactical, shotgun caliber: 12-gauge
 FN SCAR-H TPR, marksman rifle caliber: 7.62×51mm NATO 
 Accuracy International AXMC, sniper rifle caliber: .338 Lapua Magnum
 Barrett M107A1, anti-material rifle caliber: 12.7×99mm NATO
 Browning M2HB QCB, heavy machine gun caliber: 12.7×99mm NATO, mounted on Jankel FOX RRV and Unimog 1.9T 4×4 JACAM
 Heckler & Koch GMG, automatic grenade launcher, caliber: 40×46mm NATO, mounted on Jankel FOFOX RRV and Unimog 1.9T 4×4 JACAM

References

External links
 The Belgian Special Forces Group

Special forces units and formations
Army units and formations of Belgium
Military units and formations established in 1993
Special forces of Belgium